Cup of Sand is a two-CD collection of singles, B-sides and various rarities (including an Adam Ant cover and a David Bowie cover) released by Superchunk in 2003. The accompanying booklet is particularly meaty, as band members Mac McCaughan, Jim Wilbur, Laura Ballance and Jon Wurster weigh in with what they remember (or don't remember) about the songs.

The song "Does Your Hometown Care?" was on the soundtrack to the 1996 film SubUrbia.

Track listing

Disc one
 "The Majestic"
 "Reg"
 "Her Royal Fisticuffs"
 "The Mine Has Been Returned To Its Original Owner"
 "A Small Definition"
 "Dance Lessons"
 "Basement Life"
 "Still Feed Myself"
 "Fader Rules"
 "Never Too Young To Smoke"
 "Detroit Has A Skyline (acoustic)"
 "Does Your Hometown Care?"

Disc two
 "Beat My Guest"
 "With Bells On"
 "Clover"
 "Sexy Ankles"
 "White Noise"
 "Thin Air"
 "Scary Monsters (and Super Creeps)"
 "1,000 Pounds (duck kee style)"
 "The Length Of Las Ramblas"
 "Becoming A Speck"
 "The Hot Break"
 "A Collection Of Accounts"
 "Blending In"

References

Superchunk albums
2003 compilation albums